Events from the year 2009 in South Korea.

Incumbents
 President: Lee Myung-bak
 Prime Minister: 
 Han Seung-soo (until 28 September), 
 Chung Un-chan (starting 28 September)

Events

January
January 20 – The outbreak of bloodshed between police and residents in Yongsan.
January 24 – Kang Ho-sun, serial killer of murdering 17 people, was arrested.
January 31 – Open the all area of Gyeongbokgung to the public.

February
February 10 – A fire at the Hwawang Mountain during the burning flame grass festival, killed 4 people and 60 wounded.
February 25 – The key issues of new media laws are brought to the table.

March 
March 24 – Korea national baseball team lost in the 2009 World Baseball Classic final with a 3–5.
March 29 – Kim Yuna set a new world record total of 207.71 as well as winning her first World Figure Skating Championships title.
March 31 – An KF-16 fighter jet crashes to the Yellow Sea. However, the pilot escaped and survived.

April
April 5 – North Korea launches its Kwangmyŏngsŏng-2 rocket.
April 30 – Roh Moo-hyun, Former President, was summoned to the prosecution.

May 
May 4 – A South Korean Navy destroyer rescues a North Korean cargo ship from Somali pirates.
May 14 – The South Korean Navy destroyer Mummu the Great and the U.S. Navy cruiser Gettysburg capture 17 suspected Somali pirates in the Gulf of Aden.
May 18 – The third summit of Large Cities Climate Leadership Group was held in Seoul until May 21.
May 21 – Supreme Court recognized a death with dignity.
May 23 – Former President Roh Moo-hyun commits suicide.
May 25 – North Korea announces that it has conducted a second successful nuclear test in the province of North Hamgyong. The United Nations Security Council condemns the reported test.
May 29 – Former President Roh Moo-hyun was given a state funeral.

June 
June 7 – Korea Republic national football team qualified for their eighth World Cup finals by beating the UAE 2-0 in a home match. It is the seventh consecutive time that the South Koreans have qualified for the tournament.
June 15 – Lee Myung-bak, South Korea's president, meets U.S. President Barack Obama in Washington to talk about North Korea.
June 18 – US, Japan, South Korea assist ADB funding to Arunachal Pradesh, old India and China territorial dispute
June 23 – Bank of Korea released the 50,000 Won note.
June 26 – The Royal Tombs of the Joseon Dynasty have been registered as a UNESCO World Heritage site.

July 
July 7 – July 2009 cyber attacks.
July 15 – Seoul–Chuncheon Expressway was opened.
July 22 – New Media special law was authoritatively passed.
July 24 – Seoul Subway Line 9 was opened.
July 28 – Chinese border police seize 70 kilograms of Vanadium metal bound for North Korea, a material used to manufacture missile components. 200,000RMB of the metal was seized at the Dandong border between China and North Korea.
July 31 – Dongui Bogam have been registered as a UNESCO Memory of the World Programme.

August 
August 1 – Gwanghwamun Plaza was opened.
August 6 – A company manager claims that a 77-day occupation of a car plant by hundreds of laid-off workers in South Korea has come to an end.
August 18 – Kim Dae-jung, President of South Korea from 1998 to 2003, and the 2000 Nobel Peace Prize recipient died of multiple organ dysfunction syndrome in Seoul.
August 23 – Former President Kim Dae-jung was given a state funeral.
August 25 – Naro-1 was launched. However, a satellite did not reach a stable orbit.

September 
September 6 – South Korea asks North Korea to explain a sudden discharge of dam water which left six people dead or missing across the border.
September 26 – Families separated meet at the Mount Kumgang resort, North Korea.

October 
October 12 – Korea established their second Ocean Research Station in Gageo Reef.
October 19 – Incheon Bridge was opened.
October 24 – Kia Tigers won the 2009 KBO season and 2009 Korean Series, which is the first double victory  since 1997.
October 28 – The main opposition Democratic Party wins three out of five seats in by-elections in South Korea.

November 
November 7 – Pohang Steelers beating Al-Ittihad 2–1 to win the title of 2009 AFC Champions League.
November 10 – Battle of Daecheong.
November 12 – The College Scholastic Ability Test which is given once a year took place.
November 14 – A fire at a shooting range in Busan, killed 10 people including two Japanese tourists and injures six others.
November 21 – Jeong Nam-gyu, one of South Korea's most prolific serial killers, commits suicide in his cell on death row.

December 
December 27 – A consortium led by Korea Electric Power gets a US$20.4-billion contract to build nuclear power plants in the United Arab Emirates, the largest-ever energy deal in the Middle East.

Birth

Deaths

 February 16 – Stephen Kim Sou-hwan, 86, South Korean Roman Catholic prelate,  Archbishop of Seoul (1968–1998).
 March 7 – Jang Ja-yeon, 26, South Korean actress (Boys Over Flowers), suicide by hanging.
 April 27 – Woo Seung-yeon, 25, South Korean actress and model, suicide by hanging.
 May 17 – Jung Seung-hye, 44, South Korean film producer, colon cancer.
 May 22 – Yeo Woon-kay, 69, South Korean actress, kidney cancer.
 May 23 – Roh Moo-hyun, former president of South Korea (born 1946), suicide.
 June 3 -Do Kum-bong, 79, actress.
 June 28 – Yu Hyun-mok, 83, film director died of cerebral infarction.
 July 12 – Ko Mi Young, 42, Climber, false step.
 August 4 – Cho Oh Ryun, 57, South Korean Merman, heart attack.
 August 18 – Kim Dae-jung, 85, former president of South Korea, cardiac arrest.
 September 1 – Jang Jin-young, 35, South Korean actress, stomach cancer.
 October 31 – Lee Hurak, 85, Politician.
 November 4 –  Park Yong-oh, 72, Enterpriser, suicide.
 November 19 – Daul Kim, 20, Model, suicide by hanging.

See also
 2009 in South Korean music

References

 
South Korea
South Korea
Years of the 21st century in South Korea
2000s in South Korea